Arvicolini is a tribe of voles in the subfamily Arvicolinae.

A 2021 study found that Arvicola may not belong in this group, instead being sister to the tribe Lagurini.

List of species
Tribe Arvicolini
Genus Arvicola - water voles
European (or Northern) water vole, Arvicola amphibius (Arvicola terrestris)
Southwestern (or Southern) water vole, Arvicola sapidus
Montane water vole, Arvicola scherman
Genus Blanfordimys
Afghan vole, Blanfordimys afghanus
Bucharian vole, Blanfordimys bucharicus
Genus Chionomys - snow voles
Caucasian snow vole, Chionomys gud
European snow vole, Chionomys nivalis
Robert's snow vole, Chionomys roberti
Genus Lasiopodomys
Brandt's vole, Lasiopodomys brandtii
Plateau vole, Lasiopodomys fuscus
Mandarin vole, Lasiopodomys mandarinus
Genus Lemmiscus
Sagebrush vole, Lemmiscus curtatus
Genus Microtus - voles
Insular vole, Microtus abbreviatus
California vole, Microtus californicus
Rock vole, Microtus chrotorrhinus
Long-tailed vole, Microtus longicaudus
Mexican vole, Microtus mexicanus
Singing vole, Microtus miurus
Water vole, Microtus richardsoni
Zempoaltépec vole, Microtus umbrosus
Taiga vole, Microtus xanthognathus
Subgenus Microtus
 Short-tailed field vole Microtus agrestis
 Anatolian vole Microtus anatolicus
 Common vole Microtus arvalis
 Cabrera's vole Microtus cabrerae
 Doğramaci's vole Microtus dogramacii
 Elbeyli vole Microtus elbeyli
 Günther's vole Microtus guentheri
 Harting's vole Microtus hartingii
 Tien Shan vole Microtus ilaeus
 Persian vole Microtus irani
 Mediterranean field vole Microtus lavernedii
 Kerman vole Microtus kermanensis
 Turkish vole Microtus lydius
 East European vole Microtus mystacinus
 Altai vole Microtus obscurus
 Paradox vole Microtus paradoxus
 Qazvin vole Microtus qazvinensis
 Portuguese field vole Microtus rosianus
 Schidlovsky's vole Microtus schidlovskii
 Social vole Microtus socialis
 Transcaspian vole Microtus transcaspicus
Subgenus Blanfordimys
 Afghan vole Microtus afghanus
 Bucharian vole Microtus bucharicus
 Juniper vole Microtus juldaschi
Subgenus Terricola
Bavarian pine vole, Microtus bavaricus
Calabria pine vole, Microtus brachycercus
Daghestan pine vole, Microtus daghestanicus
Mediterranean pine vole, Microtus duodecimcostatus
Felten's vole, Microtus felteni
Liechtenstein's pine vole, Microtus liechtensteini
Lusitanian pine vole, Microtus lusitanicus
Major's pine vole, Microtus majori
Alpine pine vole, Microtus multiplex
Sicilian pine vole Microtus nebrodensis
Savi's pine vole, Microtus savii
Tatra pine vole, Microtus tatricus
Thomas's pine vole, Microtus thomasi
Subgenus Mynomes
 Gray-tailed vole Microtus canicaudus
 Western meadow vole Microtus drummondi
 Florida salt marsh vole Microtus dukecampbelli
 Montane vole Microtus montanus
 Creeping vole Microtus oregoni
 Eastern meadow vole Microtus pennsylvanicus
 Townsend's vole Microtus townsendii
Subgenus Alexandromys
Clarke's vole, Microtus clarkei
Evorsk vole, Microtus evoronensis
Reed vole, Microtus fortis
Gerbe's vole, Microtus gerbei
Taiwan vole, Microtus kikuchii
Lacustrine vole, Microtus limnophilus
Maximowicz's vole, Microtus maximowiczii
Middendorf's vole, Microtus middendorffi
Mongolian vole, Microtus mongolicus
Japanese grass vole, Microtus montebelli
Muisk vole, Microtus mujanensis
Tundra vole (root vole), Microtus oeconomus
Sakhalin vole, Microtus sachalinensis
Subgenus Stenocranius
Narrow-headed vole, Microtus gregalis
Subgenus Pitymys
Guatemalan vole, Microtus guatemalensis
Tarabundí vole, Microtus oaxacensis
Woodland vole, Microtus pinetorum
Jalapan pine vole, Microtus quasiater
Subgenus Pedomys
Prairie vole, Microtus ochrogaster
Subgenus Hyrcanicola
Schelkovnikov's pine vole, Microtus schelkovnikovi
Genus Neodon - mountain voles
Chinese scrub vole, Neodon irene
Sikkim vole, Neodon sikimensis
Forrest's mountain vole, Neodon forresti
Linzhi mountain vole, Neodon linzhiensis
Genus Phaiomys
Blyth's vole, Phaiomys leucurus
Genus Proedromys
Duke of Bedford's vole, Proedromys bedfordi
Liangshan vole, Proedromys liangshanensis
Genus Volemys
Szechuan vole, Volemys millicens
Marie's vole, Volemys musseri

Fossil genera
Genus Mimomys - Plio-Pleistocene

References

 
Voles and lemmings
Mammal tribes
Taxa named by John Edward Gray